KLYQ (1240 AM) is a radio station broadcasting a news/talk format. Licensed to Hamilton, Montana, United States, the station is currently owned by Townsquare Media and licensed to Townsquare License, LLC. KLYQ has studios at 320 North First Street in Hamilton, Montana.

The station was assigned the "KLYQ" call letters by the Federal Communications Commission.

The station previously aired oldies, but on February 2, 2017 became a simulcast of Missoula's KGVO, albeit with separate branding.

Previous logo
  (KLYQ's logo under former news/talk format)

References

External links
Official Website
Flash Stream, MP3 Stream

News and talk radio stations in the United States
Radio stations established in 1961
LYQ
Ravalli County, Montana
1961 establishments in Montana
Townsquare Media radio stations